Slobodan Bogoevski was the first Director of the Administration for Security and Counterintelligence in Macedonia.

References

Macedonian politicians
Living people
People from Skopje
Year of birth missing (living people)